Timoudi (Arabic: ﺗﻴﻤﻮدى) is a town and commune in Kerzaz District, Béchar Province, in western Algeria. According to the 2008 census its population is 2,389, up from 2,116 in 1998, with an annual population growth rate of 1.2%.

Geography

Climate

Timoudi has a hot desert climate (Köppen climate classification BWh), with extremely hot summers and cool winters, and very little precipitation throughout the year.

Economy

Agriculture is the main industry in Timoudi. There are a total of 54,000 date palms planted in the commune. As of 2009 there were 1,009 sheep, 684 goats, 45 camels, and 10 cattle.

Infrastructure and housing

95% of Timoudi's population is connected to drinking water, 95% is connected to the sewerage system, and 90% (including 729 buildings) have access to electricity. There are no fuel service stations in the town; the nearest is in Kerzaz.

Timoudi has a total of 628 houses, of which 204 are occupied, giving an occupation rate of 11.7 inhabitants per occupied building, by far the highest in the province.

Transportation

Education

There are 3 elementary schools, with 21 classrooms including 15 in use. There are a total of 634 school students.

4.3% of the population has a tertiary education, and another 16.7% has competed secondary education. The overall literacy rate is 72.3%, and is 86.4% among males and 58.3% among females.

Health

Timoudi has 3 room care facilities, but otherwise few healthcare services are available. The nearest polyclinic is in Ouled Khoudir, and the nearest hospital is in Béni Abbès.

Religion

Timoudi has 5 operational mosques.

Localities
The commune is composed of four localities:

Timoudi
Boutarfaya
Ben-Abdelkader
Lemouih

References

Neighbouring towns and cities

Communes of Béchar Province